Sheykh Makan (also Romanized as Sheykh Makān; also known as Qal‘eh-ye Sheykh Mākhūn, Shaikh Mākūn, and Sheykh Mākhūn) is a village in Aramu Rural District, in the Central District of Darreh Shahr County, Ilam Province, Iran. At the 2006 census, its population was 800, in 154 families. The village is populated by Kurds.

References 

Populated places in Darreh Shahr County
Kurdish settlements in Ilam Province